Teissieridae is a family of cnidarians belonging to the order Anthoathecata.

Genera:
 Pseudosolanderia Bouillon & Gravier-Bonnet, 1988
 Teissiera Bouillon, 1974

References

Capitata
Cnidarian families